Boiruna maculata, the Mussurana,  is a species of snake in the family Colubridae. The species can be found in Bolivia, Brazil, Argentina, Uruguay, and Paraguay.

References 

Mussuranas
Boiruna
Reptiles of Bolivia
Reptiles of Brazil
Reptiles of Argentina
Reptiles of Uruguay
Reptiles of Paraguay
Reptiles described in 1896
Taxa named by George Albert Boulenger